The Little River in New Hampshire may refer to:

Little River (Ammonoosuc River), a tributary of the Ammonoosuc River
Little River (Big River), a tributary of the Big River
Little River (Brentwood, New Hampshire), a tributary of the Exeter River
Little River (Exeter, New Hampshire), another tributary of the Exeter River
Little River (Lamprey River), a tributary of the Lamprey River
Little River (Merrimack River) in New Hampshire and Massachusetts, a tributary of the Merrimack River
Little River (New Hampshire Atlantic coast), in the Seacoast region of New Hampshire